The Honourable Sylvia Wynter, O.J. (Holguín, Cuba, 11 May 1928) is a Jamaican novelist,[1] dramatist,[2] critic, philosopher, and essayist.[3] Her work combines insights from the natural sciences, the humanities, art, and anti-colonial struggles in order to unsettle what she refers to as the "overrepresentation of Man." Black studies, economics, history, neuroscience, psychoanalysis, literary analysis, film analysis, and philosophy are some of the fields she draws on in her scholarly work.

Biography
Sylvia Wynter was born in Cuba to Jamaican parents, actress Lola Maude (Reid) Wynter and tailor Percival Wynter. At the age of two, she and her brother Hector and their parents returned to their home country of Jamaica. She attended the Ebenezer primary school in Kingston and, at the age of 9, won a scholarship to attend the St Andrew High School for Girls, also in Kingston. In 1946, she was competed for and won the Jamaica Centenary Scholarship for Girls, which took her to King's College London to read for her B.A. in modern languages (Spanish) from 1947 to 1951. She was awarded the M.A. in December 1953 for her thesis, a critical edition of a Spanish comedia, A lo que obliga el honor.

In 1956, Wynter met the Guyanese actor and novelist Jan Carew, who became her second husband. In 1958, she completed Under the Sun, a full-length stage play, which was bought by the Royal Court Theatre in London. In 1962, Wynter published her only novel, The Hills of Hebron.

After separating from Carew in the early 1960s, Wynter returned to academia, and in 1963, was appointed assistant lecturer in Hispanic literature at the Mona campus of the University of the West Indies. She remained there until 1974. During this time the Jamaican government commissioned her to write the play 1865–A Ballad for a Rebellion, about the Morant Bay rebellion, and a biography of Sir Alexander Bustamante, the first prime minister of independent Jamaica.

In 1974, Wynter was invited by the Department of Literature at the University of California at San Diego to be a professor of Comparative and Spanish Literature and to lead a new program in Third World literature. She left UCSD in 1977 to become chairperson of African and Afro-American Studies, and professor of Spanish in the Department of Spanish and Portuguese at Stanford University, where she worked until 1997. She is now Professor Emerita at Stanford University.

In the mid– to late–1960s, Wynter began writing critical essays addressing her interests in Caribbean, Latin American, and Spanish history and literatures. In 1968 and 1969 she published a two-part essay proposing to transform scholars' very approach to literary criticism, "We Must Learn to Sit Down Together and Talk About a Little Culture: Reflections on West Indian Writing and Criticism." Wynter has since written numerous essays in which she seeks to rethink the fullness of human ontologies, which, she argues, have been curtailed by what she describes as an over-representation of (western bourgeois) Man as if it/he were the only available mode of complete humanness. She suggests how multiple knowledge sources and texts might frame our worldview differently.

In 2010, Sylvia Wynter was awarded the Order of Jamaica (OJ) for services in the fields of education, history, and culture.

Critical work
Sylvia Wynter's scholarly work is highly poetic, expository, and complex. Her work attempts to elucidate the development and maintenance of colonial modernity and the modern man. She interweaves science, philosophy, literary theory, and critical race theory to explain how the European man came to be considered the epitome of humanity, "Man 2" or "the figure of man". Wynter's theoretical framework has changed and deepened over the years.

In her essay "Towards the Sociogenic Principle: Fanon, Identity, the Puzzle of Conscious Experience, and What It Is Like to be 'Black,' " Wynter developed a theoretical framework she refers to as the "sociogenic principle," which would become central to her work. Wynter derives this theory from an analysis of Frantz Fanon's notion of "sociogeny." Wynter argues that Fanon's theorization of sociogeny envisions human being (or experience) as not merely biological, but also based in stories and symbolic meanings generated within culturally specific contexts. Sociogeny as a theory therefore overrides, and cannot be understood within, Cartesian dualism for Wynter. The social and the cultural influence the biological.

In "Unsettling the Coloniality of Being/Power/Truth/Freedom: Towards the Human, After Man, Its Overrepresentation—An Argument," Wynter explains that the West uses race to attempt to answer the questions of who and what we are—particularly after the enlightenment period that unveils religion as incapable of answering those questions.

Works

Novel
 The Hills of Hebron. London: Jonathan Cape, 1962. Extracted in Daughters of Africa (1992), ed. Margaret Busby.

Critical text
 Do Not Call Us Negros: How Multicultural Textbooks Perpetuate Racism (1992)
 We Must Learn to Sit Down Together and Talk About a Little Culture: Decolonizing Essays 1967–1984 (2022)

Drama
 Miracle in Lime Lane (1959)
 Shh... It's a Wedding (1961)
 1865 – A Ballad for a Rebellion (1965)
 The House and Land of Mrs. Alba (1968)
 Maskarade (1973)

Film
The Big Pride (1961), with Jan Carew

Essays/criticism
 "The Instant-Novel Now." New World Quarterly 3.3 (1967): 78–81.
 "Lady Nugent’s Journal." Jamaica Journal 1:1 (1967): 23–34.
 "We Must Learn to Sit Down Together and Talk about a Little Culture: Reflections on West Indian Writing and Criticism: Part One." Jamaica Journal 2:4 (1968): 23–32.
 "We Must Learn to Sit Down Together and Talk about a Little Culture: Reflections on West Indian Writing and Criticism: Part Two." Jamaica Journal 3:1 (1969): 27–42.
 "Book Reviews: Michael Anthony Green Days by the River and The Games Were Coming." Caribbean Studies 9.4 (1970): 111–118.
 "Jonkonnu in Jamaica: Towards the Interpretation of the Folk Dance as a Cultural Process." Jamaica Journal 4:2 (1970): 34–48.
 "Novel and History, Plot and Plantation." Savacou 5 (1971): 95–102.
 "Creole Criticism: A Critique." New World Quarterly 5:4 (1972): 12–36.
 "One-Love—Rhetoric or Reality?—Aspects of Afro-Jamaicanism." Caribbean Studies 12:3 (1972): 64–97. 
 "After Word." High Life for Caliban. By Lemuel Johnson. Ardis, 1973.
 "Ethno or Socio Poetics." Alcheringa/Ethnopoetics 2:2 (1976): 78–94.
 "The Eye of the Other." Blacks in Hispanic Literature: Critical Essays. Ed. Miriam DeCosta-Willis. Kennikat Press, 1977. 8–19.
 "A Utopia from the Semi-Periphery: Spain, Modernization, and the Enlightenment." Science Fiction Studies 6:1 (1979): 100–107.
 "History, Ideology, and the Reinvention of the Past in Achebe's Things Fall Apart and Laye's The Dark Child." Minority Voices 2:1 (1978): 43–61.
 "Sambos and Minstrels." Social Text 1 (Winter 1979): 149–156.
 "In Quest of Matthew Bondsman: Some Cultural Notes on the Jamesian Journey." Urgent Tasks 12 (Summer 1981).
 Beyond Liberal and Marxist Leninist Feminisms: Towards an Autonomous Frame of Reference, Institute for Research on Women and Gender, 1982.
 "New Seville and the Conversion Experience of Bartolomé de Las Casas: Part One." Jamaica Journal 17:2 (1984): 25–32.
 "New Seville and the Conversion Experience of Bartolomé de Las Casas: Part Two." Jamaica Journal 17:3 (1984): 46–55.
 "The Ceremony Must Be Found: After Humanism." Boundary II 12:3 & 13:1 (1984): 17–70.
 "On Disenchanting Discourse: 'Minority' Literary Criticism and Beyond." Cultural Critique 7 (Fall 1987): 207–44.
 "Beyond the Word of Man: Glissant and the New Discourse of the Antilles." World Literature Today 63 (Autumn 1989): 637–647.
 "Beyond Miranda's Meanings: Un/Silencing the 'Demonic Ground' of Caliban's Women." Out of the Kumbla: Caribbean Women and Literature. Ed. Carole Boyce Davies and Elaine Savory Fido. Africa World Press, 1990. 355–372.
 "Columbus and the Poetics of the Propter Nos." Annals of Scholarship 8:2 (1991): 251–286.
 "Tras el 'Hombre,' su última palabra: Sobre el posmodernismo, les damnés y el principio sociogénico." La teoría política en la encrucijada descolonial. Nuevo Texto Crítico, Año IV, No. 7, (Primer Semester de 1991): 43–83.
 "'Columbus, The Ocean Blue and 'Fables that Stir the Mind': To Reinvent the Study of Letters." Poetics of the Americas: Race, Founding and Textuality 8:2 (1991): 251–286.
 "Rethinking 'Aesthetics': Notes Towards a Deciphering Practice." Ex-iles: Essays on Caribbean Cinema. Ed. Mbye Cham. Africa World Press, 1992. 238–279.
 "'No Humans Involved': An open letter to my colleagues". Voices of the African Diaspora 8:2 (1992).
 "Beyond the Categories of the Master Conception: The Counterdoctrine of the Jamesian Poiesis." C.L.R. James's Caribbean. Ed. Paget Henry and Paul Buhle. Duke University Press, 1992. 63–91.
 "But What Does Wonder Do? Meanings, Canons, Too?: On Literary Texts, Cultural Contexts, and What It's Like to Be One/Not One of Us." Stanford Humanities Review 4:1 (1994).
 "The Pope Must Have Been Drunk, the King of Castile a Madman: Culture as Actuality and the Caribbean Rethinking of Modernity." Reordering of Culture: Latin America, the Caribbean and Canada in the 'Hood. (1995): 17–42. 
 "1492: A New World View" (1995), Race, Discourse, and the Origin of the Americas: A New World View. Ed. Sylvia Wynter, Vera Lawrence Hyatt, and Rex Nettleford. Smithsonian Institution Press, 1995. 5–57.
 "Is 'Development' a Purely Empirical Concept, or also Teleological?: A Perspective from 'We the Underdeveloped'." Prospects for Recovery and Sustainable Development in Africa. Ed. Aguibou Y. Yansané. Greenwood, 1996. 299–316.
 "Columbus, the Ocean Blue, and 'Fables That Stir the Mind': To Reinvent the Study of Letters." Poetics of the Americas: Race, Founding and Textuality. Ed. Bainard Cowan and Jefferson Humphries. Louisiana State UP, 1997. 141–163.
 "'Genital Mutilation' or 'Symbolic Birth?' Female Circumcision, Lost Origins, and the Aculturalism of Feminist/Western Thought." Case Western Reserve Law Review 47.2 (1997): 501–552.
 "Black Aesthetic." The Encyclopedia of Aesthetics. Vol. 1. Oxford University Press, 1998. 273–281.
 "Africa, The West and the Analogy of Culture: The Cinematic Text After Man." Symbolic Narratives/African Cinema: Audiences, Theory and the Moving Image. Ed. June Givanni. London British Film Institute, 2000. 25–76.
"The Re-Enchantment of Humanism: An Interview with Sylvia Wynter", Small Axe 8 (2000): 119–207.
 "'A Different Kind of Creature': Caribbean Literature, the Cyclops Factor and the Second Poetics of the Propter Nos." Annals of Scholarship 12:1/2 (2001).
 "Towards the Sociogenic Principle: Fanon, Identity, the Puzzle of Conscious Experience, and What It Is Like to be 'Black.'" National Identities and Socio-Political Changes in Latin America. Ed. Mercedes F. Durán-Cogan and Antonio Gómez-Moriana. New York: Routledge, 2001. 30–66.
"Unsettling the Coloniality of Being/Power/Truth/Freedom: Towards the Human, After Man, Its Overrepresentation – An Argument". CR: The New Centennial Review 3.3 (2003): 257–337.
 "On How We Mistook the Map for the Territory and Re-Imprisoned Ourselves in Our Unbearable Wrongness of Being, of Désêtre: Black Studies Toward the Human Project." Not Only the Master’s Tools: African-American Studies in Theory and Practice. Eds. Lewis R. Gordon and Jane Anna Gordon. Paradigm, 2006. 107–169.
 "Proud Flesh Inter/Views Sylvia Wynter." Greg Thomas. ProudFlesh: A New Afrikan Journal of Culture, Politics & Consciousness 4 (2006). 
 "Unparalleled Catastrophe for Our Species? Or, to Give Humanness a Different Future: Conversations." Interview. Sylvia Wynter: On Being Human as Praxis. Duke, 2014. 9–89.
 "The Ceremony Found: Towards the Autopoetic Turn/Overturn, its Autonomy of Human Agency, and the Extraterritoriality of (Self-)Cognition." Black Knowledges/Black Struggles: Essays in Critical Epistemology. Eds Jason R. Ambroise and Sabine Broeck. Liverpool, UK: Liverpool University Press, 2015. 184–252.
Black Metamorphosis: New Natives in a New World (unpublished manuscript)

References

Sources
Buck, Claire (ed.), Bloomsbury Guide to Women's Literature. London: Bloomsbury, 1992. 
Wynter, Sylvia, and David Scott. "The Re-Enchantment of Humanism: An Interview with Sylvia Wynter". Small Axe, 8 (September 2000): 119–207.
Wynter, Sylvia. "Unsettling the Coloniality of Being/Power/Truth/Freedom: Towards the Human, After Man, Its Overrepresentation—An Argument." CR: The New Centennial Review, Volume 3, Number 3, Fall 2003, pp. 257–337.

Further reading
 Jason R. Ambroise, "On Sylvia Wynter's Darwinian Heresy of the ' Third Event '." American Quarterly 70, no 4 (December 2018): 847–856.
 Anthony Bogues (ed.), After Man, Towards the Human: Critical Essays on Sylvia Wynter, 2006.
 Kamau Brathwaite, "The Love Axe/1; Developing a Caribbean Aesthetic", BIM, 16 July 1977.
 Daryl Cumber Dance (ed.), Fifty Caribbean Writers: A Bio-bibliographical Critical Sourcebook, 1986.
 Demetrius L. Eudell, "'Come on Kid, Let’s Go Get the Thing': The Sociogenic Principle and the Being of Being Black/Human." Black Knowledges/Black Struggles: Essays in Critical Epistemology. Ed. Jason Ambroise and Sabine Broeck. Liverpool University Press, 2015. 21–43.
 Demetrius L. Eudell, "From Mode of Production to Mode of Auto-Institution: Sylvia Wynter's Black Metamorphosis of the Labor Question". Small Axe 49 (March 2016): 47–61. 
 Karen M. Gagne, "On the Obsolescence of the Disciplines: Frantz Fanon and Sylvia Wynter Propose a New Mode of Being Human." Human Architecture: Journal of the Sociology of Self-Knowledge 5 (2007): 251–264.
 Kelly Baker Josephs, "The Necessity for Madness: Negotiating Nation in Sylvia Wynter’s The Hills of Hebron." Disturbers of the Peace: Representations of Madness in Anglophone Caribbean Literature. University of Virginia Press, 2013. 45–68.
 David Scott. "Preface: Sylvia Wynter's Agonistic Intimations." Small Axe 49 (March 2016): vii–x.
 Greg Thomas, "The Body Politics of 'Man' and 'Woman' in an 'Anti-Black' World: Sylvia Wynter on Humanism's Empire (A Critical Resource Guide)." On Maroonage: Ethical Confrontations with Anti-Blackness. Ed. P. Khalil Saucier and Tryon P. Woods. Africa World, 2015. 67–107.
 Greg Thomas, "Marronnons / Let's Maroon: Sylvia Wynter's Black Metamorphosis as a Species of Maroonage". Small Axe 49 (March 2016): 62–78.
 Shirley Toland-Dix, "The Hills of Hebron: Sylvia Wynter’s Disruption of the Narrative of the Nation." Small Axe: 25 (February 2008): 57–76. 
 Derrick White. "Black Metamorphosis: A Prelude to Sylvia Wynter’s Theory of the Human". The C.L.R. James Journal 16.1 (2010): 127–48.
Sylvia Wynter, Sylvia Wynter: On Being Human as Praxis. Katherine McKittrick, (ed).  Duke University Press, 2014.
Hannah Giorgis, "When They See Us and the Persistent Logic of 'No Humans Involved'", The Atlantic, 3 June 2019.

External links

 "Sylvia Wynter: An Oral History," Stanford Historical Society Oral History Program, 2017.

1928 births
Living people
20th-century Jamaican novelists
University of the West Indies academics
Alumni of King's College London
Members of the Order of Jamaica
Jamaican dramatists and playwrights
Jamaican women dramatists and playwrights
20th-century Jamaican women writers
Jamaican academics
Jamaican women novelists
Jamaican novelists
Caribbean philosophers
Women philosophers
Jamaican women academics
Jamaican female dancers
Jamaican dancers
Jamaican actors
Jamaican expatriates in Cuba
University of California, San Diego faculty
Stanford University faculty
Jamaican expatriates in the United Kingdom
Jamaican expatriates in the United States